{{DISPLAYTITLE:C20H26N2}}
The molecular formula C20H26N2 (molar mass: 294.43 g/mol, exact mass: 294.2096 u) may refer to:

 Dimetacrine, or acripramine
 Tetrindole
 Trimipramine

Molecular formulas